The third season of the American television series Black Lightning, which is based on the DC Comics character Jefferson Pierce / Black Lightning, premiered on The CW on October 7, 2019. The season is produced by Berlanti Productions, Akil Productions, Warner Bros. Television, and DC Entertainment. It was ordered in January 2019 and production began that July, with Salim Akil once again serving as showrunner.

The season continues to follow Jefferson, a high school principal-turned-teacher and re-emerged superhero Black Lightning, in his fight against the corrupt government agency known as the A.S.A. as they occupy his community of Freeland, as well as new threats from the country of Markovia. The mid-season finale and ninth episode of the season also ties into the Arrowverse crossover event "Crisis on Infinite Earths" and leads into Black Lightning's appearance in the crossover. Cress Williams stars as Jefferson, along with principal cast members China Anne McClain, Nafessa Williams, Marvin "Krondon" Jones III, Christine Adams, Damon Gupton, Jordan Calloway, and James Remar also returning from previous seasons.

Episodes

Cast and characters

Main  
 Cress Williams as Jefferson Pierce / Black Lightning
 China Anne McClain as Jennifer Pierce / Lightning
 Nafessa Williams as Anissa Pierce / Blackbird / Thunder
 Christine Adams as Lynn Stewart
 Marvin "Krondon" Jones III as Tobias Whale
 Damon Gupton as Bill Henderson 
 Jordan Calloway as Khalil Payne / Painkiller
 James Remar as Peter Gambi

Recurring 

 Bill Duke as Agent Percy Odell
 Rafael Castillo as Devonte Jones
 Will Catlett as Latavius "Lala" Johnson / Tattoo Man
 Clifton Powell as Reverend Jeremiah Holt
 Adetinpo Thomas as Jamillah Olsen
 Justin Livingston as Cloaked Gambi
 Sh'Kia Augustin as the voice of Shonda
 Jasun Jabbar Wardlaw Jr. as Tavon Singley
 Thomas K. Belgry as Colonel Yuri Mosin
 Chantal Thuy as Grace Choi
 Jahking Guillory as Brandon Marshall / Geo
 Katy O'Brian as Major Sara Grey
 Vernika Rowe as Auntie Gina
 Taylor Polidore as Lisa
 Boone Platt as Sergeant Gardner Grayle
 Renell Gibbs as Kyrie
 Jason Louder as Frank "Two-Bits" Tanner
 Jennifer Riker as Dr. Helga Jace
 Christopher A'mmanuel as Baron / TC
 Wayne Brady as Tyson Sykes / Gravedigger

Guest 

 Zoe Renee as Maryam Luqman
 Christopher B. Duncan as Commander Carson Williams
 Chase Alexander as Ned Creegan / Cyclotronic
 Myles Truitt as Issa Williams
 Warren "WAWA" Snipe as Thierry
 Birgundi Baker as Anaya
 Euseph Messiah as Nurse Michael Allen
 P. J. Byrne as Principal Mike Lowry
 Gabrielle Garcia as Erica Moran
 Tosin Morohunfola as Instant
 Brandon Hirsch as Dr. Matthew Blair
 Jill Scott as Evelyn Stillwater-Ferguson / Lady Eve
 Jennifer Christa Palmer as Representative Nagar
 Tony Isabella as Judge Isabella
 Trevor Von Eeden as Judge von Eeden

Production

Development 
On January 31, 2019, The CW renewed the series for its third season. On the early renewal of Black Lightning as well as other series, network president Mark Pedowitz released a statement reading, "The early renewal of these signature CW series gives us a head start on laying out the 2019-20 season, and this is just the beginning. These shows provide a strong foundation for our multiplatform programming strategy, and we look forward to building on this with even more returning and new shows as we approach the May upfront." Executive producer and series developer Salim Akil returned to serve as the season's showrunner. On January 7, 2020, The CW renewed the series for a fourth season.

Writing 
Lead actor Cress Williams revealed that the third season's narrative would begin approximately a month and a half after the season two finale. He also observed that the season picks up with the Pierce family "a little disjointed" and that Jefferson's immediate focus, shared with his ex-wife Lynn, would be to "keep both of [their] daughters out of the war that's coming." After the fictional Eastern European country of Markovia was revealed as the entity responsible for the season two villains known as the Masters of Disaster and that the nation had been building up its own metahuman army, Williams teased that the third season would see the world of the series "getting bigger" with Markovia becoming the source of a number of new metahumans, both heroes and villains. Showrunner Salim Akil described Markovia as "a small, power-hungry regime" that seeks to "weaponize" Freeland's metahumans. He also stated that, while everyday life in Freeland would still be a focus of the season, "we want our stories to talk about concerns not just for black folk but for people in general. We'll cover mental health and addiction issues that affect the whole country." Williams' role in several episodes was reduced to accommodate his late-decision appearance in the Arrowverse's annual crossover event.

Discussing Jennifer's ongoing struggle to control her powers due to the emotional discovery of her abilities, actress China Anne McClain noted that, "When the season starts, we see that Jennifer is getting more powerful, stronger, and she's also getting more emotional. We can expect a combination of all three of those this season." Akil additionally disclosed that Jennifer being stronger than both her father and her sister on account of her unique ability to generate her own electricity would also raise the issue of who is ultimately in control amongst the three. Meanwhile, Nafessa Williams said of her character Anissa's journey, "Season one was about her understanding and discovering her powers, in season two she is kind of starting to perfect them and trust herself. Season three, she is a woman. She trusts that and she is from under the leadership of her father and she is always willing to take advice but sometimes her ideas and her ways of doing things and her mindset is different from her father's." As for Tobias, the main villain of the series' first two seasons who was last seen incarcerated, Akil stated that since "his powers are taken [off the table...] he's going to have to use his superior intelligence to work his way out — and not his brawn."

Jordan Calloway revealed that his character Khalil, who was thought to have perished during the previous season until re-emerging in the season finale, would "come back a little different" in season three. The sentiment was echoed by McClain, who additionally cast doubt on the future of their characters' romantic relationship. Calloway explained, "[Khalil] might go both sides, good or bad. We saw what he was doing under the control of Tobias, and now you add another huge big bad, Agent Odell, the stakes are much higher for him. [...] What happens when you cross an individual like that?" Speaking on the circumstances surrounding Khalil's return, Akil hinted that, "The A.S.A.'s Agent Odell thought it best to keep him in a pod until they [could] figure out what to do with him." Akil characterized Agent Odell as "a true American patriot, [which] makes him a deadly soldier" and shared that the Pierces would be reluctantly working alongside him in order to protect their community, as it was revealed in the second season finale that Agent Odell knows of the Pierces' secret identities and abilities. Furthermore, Williams teased that Jefferson would be making "a really big sacrifice" this season that would reveal "a little bit more of his angrier side" and "[propel] him at the beginning of the season."

Casting 
Main cast members Cress Williams, China Anne McClain, Nafessa Williams, Christine Adams, Marvin "Krondon" Jones III, Damon Gupton, Jordan Calloway, and James Remar return from previous seasons as Jefferson Pierce / Black Lightning, Jennifer Pierce / Lightning, Anissa Pierce / Thunder, Lynn Stewart, Tobias Whale, Bill Henderson, Khalil Payne / Painkiller, and Peter Gambi, respectively.

On October 10, 2019, it was announced that Wayne Brady would play a major recurring role this season as Tyson Sykes / Gravedigger, a World War II-era "super soldier" and American-turned-Markovian asset. On January 19, 2020, Gupton revealed that he had been let go from the series and this would be his final season as a series regular.

Design 
This season features a new suit design for Jefferson Pierce as Black Lightning. In place of the previous suit's glowing blue and gold bolts across the chest, a textured gold design with blue and black weaving is featured throughout the torso, arms, and gloves. The mask is also slightly redesigned with dark red-tinted lenses. As Anissa Pierce officially takes on the name "Blackbird" this season as a second secret identity, she also receives a new costume for the alter-ego that consists of a black hood and a mask that covers the lower half of her face.

Filming 
Production for the season began on July 9, 2019 in Atlanta, Georgia. A week of production was carved out for Williams to film his scenes for the Arrowverse crossover event "Crisis on Infinite Earths" in Vancouver, British Columbia. Filming for the third season concluded on January 21, 2020.

Arrowverse tie-ins 
The mid-season finale and ninth episode of the season titled "The Book of Resistance: Chapter Four: Earth Crisis" ties into the Arrowverse crossover event "Crisis on Infinite Earths" and leads into Cress Williams' appearances as Black Lightning in Part Three and Part Five of the crossover. Following the event, Black Lightning officially joins the Arrowverse franchise and, beginning with the season's tenth episode, retroactively shares a new continuity with the other series of the shared universe, all of which now collectively inhabit the new world of Earth-Prime.

Release

Broadcast 
The third season premiered on The CW in the United States on October 7, 2019. The season was originally scheduled to debut two weeks later on October 21 prior to the reveal that Black Lightning would be involved in the Arrowverse crossover event "Crisis on Infinite Earths" on The CW. The series continues to air on Mondays at 9:00pm during the 2019–20 television season, but now airs following All American. The 16th and final episode of the season will air on March 9, 2020.

Home media 
Having acquired the international distribution and streaming rights for Black Lightning, Netflix previously aired new episodes of the first two seasons weekly in regions outside of the United States, including Canada, Australia, and the United Kingdom. However, following the expiration of the deal between the streamer and the network, the third season will be added to Netflix internationally at a later date. The season was released in its entirety on Netflix in the United States on March 17, 2020, 8 days after the finale aired on The CW.

Marketing 
Several of the season's main cast members attended San Diego Comic-Con on July 20, 2019 to promote the season. The first trailer of the season was released on September 24.

Reception

Ratings

Critical response 
The third season of Black Lightning has received generally positive reviews from professional critics. On the review aggregation website Rotten Tomatoes, the season holds a 100% approval rating, with an average rating of 7.92/10, based on 6 reviews.

Reviewing the premiere for Entertainment Weekly, Christian Holub gave the episode a "B+" grade, writing, "Black Lightning has been able to do a really good job of showcasing real-life racial dynamics and structural inequities through its comic-flavored storytelling. And in season 3, the show is aiming directly at our real-life crisis of family separation and putting kids in cages. [...] After a bit of a sophomore slump, I'm excited to see where Black Lightning goes from here." Nicole Hill of Den of Geek! assigned the premiere episode a rating of 4 out of 5. She opined that, "Black Lightning does a good job of playing with these different concepts of power and showing how they interact, overlap, and cancel each other out. [...] I hope this season maintains focus and doesn't find itself branching out too far away from its central conflicts. If the following episodes consistently operate at this level, this will be an exciting season to watch." The A.V. Clubs Kyle Fowle gave the premiere a "B+" grade and added that, "The first episode of the third season is just as politically charged as previous episodes, but this time around things feel more relevant, more attuned to this specific time and place. Black Lightning has nodded towards real life events before, but this premiere, centered around kids being rounded up, separated from their families, and locked in detention camps with no idea of when they'll get out or what they did wrong, feels particularly pointed."

Notes

References

External links 

 

2019 American television seasons
2020 American television seasons
Black Lightning (TV series) seasons